Rikard Franzén (born March 21, 1968 in Huddinge, Sweden) is a retired professional ice hockey defenceman.

Franzén spent most of his career with AIK Hockey as their top defenceman. Having originally played for the team from 1988 to 1997, he moved to Germany's Deutsche Eishockey Liga with the Kölner Haie, but after one season he returned to AIK. In 2001, Franzén moved to Switzerland's Nationalliga A with SC Bern where he spent two seasons. He then returned to the DEL, signing for the Hannover Scorpions. In 2004, Franzén returned to Sweden with Djurgårdens IF before retiring.

Career statistics

Regular season and playoffs

International

External links

Swedish ice hockey defencemen
Swedish expatriate ice hockey players in Germany
Swedish expatriate sportspeople in Switzerland
AIK IF players
Kölner Haie players
Hannover Scorpions players
SC Bern players
Djurgårdens IF Hockey players
Living people
1968 births